Timothy Horrigan is a New Hampshire politician.

Education 
Horrigan graduated from Northfield Mount Hermon School in 1975. He earned his B.A. in English from Columbia University in 1979, a M.A. in English and Comparative Literature in 1982, and his MBA in Marketing Management from the University of Southern California in 1984.

Electoral history 
Horrigan ran for election to the New Hampshire House of Representatives to represent the Strafford 7 district in 2008 and won the election. He resigned in 2010 over his remarks on Facebook against Sarah Palin. He later ran and won the election in 2010 to represent Strafford 6 and has served in the position since.

Personal life 
Horrigan was born in South Bend, Indiana. His father was an accounting and finance professor at the University of New Hampshire and served as a state representative during the 1980s.

References 

Living people
21st-century American politicians
Democratic Party members of the New Hampshire House of Representatives
Columbia College (New York) alumni
University of Southern California alumni
1956 births